Švehla is a Czech and Slovak surname. People with the name include:

Antonín Švehla (1873–1933), three-time prime minister of Czechoslovakia and agrarian politician
Henry Svehla (c. 1932–1952), Medal of Honor recipient
Róbert Švehla (1969–), Slovak-born American professional ice hockey player
Petr Švehla (1972–), Czech amateur Greco-Roman wrestler

Czech-language surnames
Slovak-language surnames